Imani Perry (born September 5, 1972) is an American interdisciplinary scholar of race, law, literature, and African-American culture.  She is currently the Hughes-Rogers Professor of African American Studies at Princeton University and a columnist for The Atlantic. Perry won the 2022 National Book Award for Nonfiction for South to America: A Journey Below the Mason-Dixon to Understand the Soul of a Nation.

Early life
Perry was born in Birmingham, Alabama, and moved to Cambridge, Massachusetts, with her parents when she was five years old. She has described herself as a "cradle Catholic".

Education and academic career
Perry received her Bachelor of Arts Degree in American Studies and Literature from Yale University in 1994. She subsequently earned her Ph.D. in American Civilization from Harvard University and her J.D. from Harvard Law School (from which she graduated at the age of 27). She completed a Future Law Professor's Fellowship and received her LLM from Georgetown University Law Center. She credits her childhood exposure to diverse cultures, regions, and religions with creating her desire to study race.

Before joining the Princeton faculty, Perry taught at Rutgers School of Law in Camden for seven years. She received the New Professor of the Year award in her first year and was promoted to full professor at the end of five years, also winning the Board of Trustees Fellowship for Scholarly Excellence. Perry was also a visiting professor at the University of Pennsylvania Law School and an adjunct professor at both the Columbia University Institute for Research in African American Studies and Georgetown University Law Center.

In 2009, Perry left Rutgers to join the faculty of Princeton University. She currently holds the title of Hughes-Rogers Professor of African American Studies and is affiliated with the Programs in Law and Public Affairs and Gender and Sexuality Studies. She has two forthcoming books, one on the history of the black national anthem (from Oxford University Press) and another on gender, neoliberalism, and the digital age (from Duke University Press).

In August 2014, Perry appeared on the public radio and podcast On Being, discussing race, community, and American consciousness with host Krista Tippett.  On November 17, 2021, Dr. Perry's collected artwork, Welfare Queen, by Amy Sherald sold for $3.9M in a Phillips New York auction.

Publications

Perry is the author of six books and has published numerous articles on law, cultural studies, and African-American studies, including a book about Lorraine Hansberry. She also wrote the notes and introduction to the Barnes and Nobles Classics edition of the Narrative of Sojourner Truth. Her work is largely influenced by the Birmingham and Frankfurt Schools, Critical Legal Studies, Critical Race Theory, and African-American literary criticism. Through her scholarship, Perry has made significant contributions to the academic study of race and American hip hop music; she contributed a chapter to 2014's Born to Use Mics: Reading Nas's Illmatic (edited by Michael Eric Dyson and Sohail Daulatzai).  Perry's 2022 book, South to America: A Journey Below the Mason-Dixon to Understand the Soul of a Nation, was a New York Times bestseller, and won the 2022 National Book Award for non-fiction.

Full publication list
 2004: Prophets of the Hood: Politics and Poetics in Hip Hop, Duke University Press; 
 2005: Narrative of Sojourner Truth, Barnes & Noble Classics Series, Notes and Introduction, Barnes & Noble; 
 2011: More Beautiful and More Terrible: The Embrace and Transcendence of Racial Inequality in the United States, New York University Press; 
 2018: Looking for Lorraine: The Radiant and Radical Life of Lorraine Hansberry, Beacon Press. 
 Winner of the 2019 PEN/Jacqueline Bograd Weld Award for Biography
 A New York Times Notable Book of 2018
 A Black Caucus of the American Library Association Honor Book for Nonfiction
 Finalist for the Lambda Literary Award for LGBTQ Nonfiction
 A 2019 Pauli Murray Book Prize Finalist
 A Triangle Award Finalist
 2018: May We Forever Stand: A History of the Black National Anthem, University of North Carolina Press, 
Nominee, 50th NAACP Image Awards, Outstanding Literary Work (Nonfiction)
 2018: Vexy Thing: On Gender and Liberation, Duke University Press. 
 2019: Breathe: A Letter to My Sons, Penguin Random House 
 2022: South to America: A Journey Below the Mason-Dixon to Understand the Soul of a Nation, Ecco Press. ISBN  978-0062977403
Winner, National Book Award for Nonfiction 2022

Controversy over arrest

On February 6, 2016, Perry was pulled over by the Princeton police, who alleged that she was speeding at 67 mph in a 45 mph zone. Her driver's license was then found to be suspended due to unpaid parking tickets, one of which was two–three years old. Perry was arrested for the outstanding warrant and physically searched. She was handcuffed, transported to the police station, and handcuffed to a bench during the booking process. Perry posted bail and was released. She subsequently drew parallels between police conduct in this incident and behavior cited in the national debate around racially-motivated mistreatment, actual or alleged,
of African Americans by the police. Video released by the Princeton Police Department revealed that she had exaggerated her claims of mistreatment by the officer. She appeared in municipal court the month after her arrest and paid $428 in traffic fines, the judge having reduced and amended the charges to a lesser offense, "from 22 miles over the speed limit, to nine miles over".

References

External links
 Princeton University, African American Studies Department
 Princeton University, Program in Law and Public Affairs
 
 

1972 births
20th-century African-American people
20th-century African-American women
21st-century African-American women writers
21st-century African-American writers
21st-century American non-fiction writers
21st-century American women writers
African-American Catholics
American women academics
American women non-fiction writers
Harvard Law School alumni
Lambda Literary Award winners
Living people
Princeton University faculty
Writers from Birmingham, Alabama
Yale University alumni
National Book Award winners